Moreh is a location mentioned in the Torah.

Moreh may also refer to:

 Moreh, India
 Elon Moreh, an Israeli settlement in the West Bank
 Moreh College, in Moreh, Manipur, India

People with the surname
 Shmuel Moreh (1932–2017), Iraqi Jewish author and academic
 Dror Moreh (born 1961), Israeli cinematographer and director
 Eliad Moreh, Israeli survivor of a 2002 terrorist attack at Hebrew University